The 2007 Le Gruyère European Curling Championships were held in Füssen, Germany December 1-8, 2007. Scotland, skipped by David Murdoch, won the gold medal by beating Norway's Thomas Ulsrud 5-3 in the final. Norway had not lost a single game entering the final.

On the women's side, Anette Norberg of Sweden captured the gold medal with a 9-4 victory over Scotland's Kelly Wood. This marks Norberg's sixth European championship in the last seven years.

Men's teams

Group A

Standings

Finland and Italy drop to the B-Group

Results
All Times Local

Session 1
December 1, 2006, 12:00

Session 2
December 1, 2006, 20:00
(Czech Republic ran out of time)

Session 3
December 2, 2006, 13:00

Session 4
December 3, 2006, 08:00

Session 5
December 3, 2006, 16:00

Session 6
December 4, 2006, 09:00

Session 7
December 4, 2006, 19:00

Session 8
December 5, 2006, 14:00

Session 9
December 6, 2006, 08:00

Tiebreakers
Thursday, December 6, 14:00

Thursday, December 6, 20:00

Playoffs

1 vs. 2 game
Friday, December 7, 08:00

3 vs. 4 game
Friday, December 7, 08:00

Semifinal
Friday, December 7, 19:00

Gold Medal Final
Saturday, December 8, 13:00

Group B1

Standings

 The team from Kazakhstan missed the competition.

Schedule

Draw 1 Saturday, December 1, 08:00
 8,  3
 10,  5
 3,  11
 vs. 

Draw 2 Saturday, December 1, 20:00
 9,  3
 vs. 
 6,  8
 9,  3

Draw 3 Sunday, December 2, 20:00
 7,  11
 13,  0
 vs. 
 5,  6

Draw 4 Monday, December 3, 16:00
 10,  2
 6,  7
 1,  7
 vs. 

Draw 5 Tuesday, December 4, 08:00
 vs. 
 6,  7
 1,  11
 7,  2

Draw 6 Tuesday, December 4, 20:00
 4,  5
 2,  8
 vs. 
 4,  7

Draw 7 Wednesday, December 5, 16:00
 vs. 
 3 vs.  11
 7 vs.  6
 6 vs.  9

Group B2

Standings

Schedule

Draw 1 Saturday, December 1, 12:00
 8,  6
 2,  8
 9,  8 (extra end)

Draw 2 Sunday, December 2, 08:00
 12,  4
 7,  9
 2,  14

Draw 3 Sunday, December 2, 16:00
 5,  10
 3,  8
 9,  8

Draw 4 Monday, December 3, 08:00
 11,  4
 4,  10
 10,  1

Draw 5 Tuesday, December 4, 12:00
 10,  0
 4,  13
 8,  3

Draw 6 Wednesday, December 5, 08:00
 8,  3
 5,  7
 3,  8

Draw 7 Wednesday, December 5, 20:00
 9,  3
 12,  1
 8,  4

Group B3

Standings

Schedule

Draw 1 Saturday, December 1, 12:00
 8,  6
 7,  10
 2,  13

Draw 2 Sunday, December 2, 08:00
 5,  3
 12,  7
 9,  8

Draw 3 Sunday, December 2, 16:00
 14,  2
 2,  5
 10,  3

Draw 4 Monday, December 3, 08:00
 7,  4
 2,  9
 10,  7

Draw 5 Tuesday, December 4, 12:00
 10,  3
 8,  5
 4,  5

Draw 6 Wednesday, December 5, 08:00
 4,  9
 2,  8
 6,  9

Draw 7 Wednesday, December 5, 20:00
 6,  7
 4,  7
 9,  5

Group B Playoffs

Challenge Games
 8,  5
 3,  8

Finals

Women's teams

Group A

Standings

Austria and Finland drop to the B-Group

Tiebreaker
Thursday, December 6, 14:00
 4,  5

Schedule
All Times Local

Draw 1 Saturday, December 1, 08:00

Draw 2 Saturday, December 1, 16:00

Draw 3 Sunday, December 2, 09:00

Draw 4 Sunday, December 2, 19:00

Draw 5 Monday, December 3, 12:00

Draw 6 Monday, December 3, 20:00

Draw 7 Tuesday, December 4, 14:00

Draw 8 Wednesday, December 5, 09:00

Draw 9 Wednesday, December 5, 19:00

Playoffs

1 vs. 2 game
Friday, December 7, 08:00

3 vs. 4 game
Friday, December 7, 08:00

Semifinal
Friday, December 7, 14:00

Gold Medal Final
Saturday, December 8, 09:00

Group B1

Standings

Tiebreakers
Thursday, December 6, 08:00
 7,  5

Thursday, December 6, 12:00
 5,  6

Schedule

Draw 1 Saturday, December 1, 08:00
 18,  0
 12,  2

Draw 2 Saturday, December 1, 16:00
 9,  8
 4,  10
 4,  7

Draw 3 Sunday, December 2, 12:00
 10,  3
 5,  6
 4,  9

Draw 4 Sunday, December 2, 20:00
 12,  10

Draw 5 Monday, December 3, 12:00
 13,  9
 2,  9
 8,  10

Draw 6 Monday, December 3, 20:00
 12,  5
 2,  12
 3,  10

Draw 7 Tuesday, December 4, 16:00
 11,  6
 12,  2
 9,  6

Draw 8 Wednesday, December 5, 12:00
 8,  5
 2,  7
 4,  8

Group B2

Standings

Schedule

Draw 1 Sunday, December 2, 12:00
 8,  7
 4,  3
 9,  4

Draw 2 Monday, December 3, 12:00
 5,  9
 6,  9
 3,  10

Draw 3 Monday, December 3, 20:00
 7,  8
 4,  9
 11,  6

Draw 4 Tuesday, December 4, 16:00
 11,  4
 13,  2
 5,  10

Draw 5 Wednesday, December 5, 12:00
 5,  7
 11,  3
 3,  9

Group B Playoffs

References

European Curling Championships
European Curling Championships, 2007
European Curling Championships
European Curling Championships
Sport in Füssen 
International curling competitions hosted by Germany